Marilyn Sellars (born December 31, 1938) is an American country music and gospel singer who had several hits during the mid-1970s on Mega Records, most notably the original version of "One Day at a Time" in 1974.

Early career
Sellars was born in Northfield, Minnesota in 1938. She started singing in church at the age of three singing "Oh, What A Beautiful Morning". Sellars began singing at functions and clubs around Minnesota as a teenager and after high school graduation in 1956, sang a variety of music with country and Gospel music being her favorites. Many of her family and friends enjoyed her singing and suggested Sellars moved to Nashville, Tennessee in 1973.

Breakthrough
Sellars signed with Mega Records in 1973 and success began quite rapidly with a song written by Marijohn Wilkin and Kris Kristofferson called "One Day at a Time". This would become a hit for Sellars in 1974 and reached No. 19 on the country charts and No. 37 on the Billboard Hot 100 charts. The album of the same name went to No. 1 on the country charts. The song would become an even bigger hit for Cristy Lane in 1980 going to number No. 1 on the country charts. Sellars had another Top 40 country hit in early 1975 with her cover version of Sammi Smith's "He's Everywhere" and released two more albums that year with Gather Me and The Door I Used To Close. Sellars had two minor hits in both 1975 and 1976 with the title tracks of both albums. After that, Mega Records closed its doors and Sellars faded quietly from view and decided to raise her family and moved back to Minnesota.

Life today
Sellars continues to perform to this day and has released several albums of country and gospel music, the most recent of these being the 2006 release of One Day at a Time: My Faith, My Country. In 2004, she was inducted into the Minnesota Country and Rock Hall of Fame.

Discography

Albums

Singles

References

Living people
1944 births
American women country singers
American country singer-songwriters
American gospel singers
People from Northfield, Minnesota
Singer-songwriters from Minnesota
21st-century American women